Pleophragmia is a genus of fungi in the family Sporormiaceae. This is a monotypic genus, containing the single species Pleophragmia leporum.

References

Pleosporales
Monotypic Dothideomycetes genera
Taxa named by Karl Wilhelm Gottlieb Leopold Fuckel